Nasrollah Hekmat (born 1957) is an Iranian philosopher and Professor of philosophy at the Shahid Beheshti University.
 
He first went to hawza and get the highest degree of Islamic studies. But in 1980 he came out from hawza and began to study philosophy. Finally in 1994 Hekmat got his PhD in Western Philosophy.

Nasrollah Hekmat's philosophy is Influenced by some Iranian and European philosophers like Avicena, Farabi, Sohrevardi, Ibn Arabi, Max Scheler and Kant.

Some of his obvious point of his philosophy are "the critic of logical thinking", "gnostisist philosophy" and existentialism.

Selected publications
All works in Persian.
1997 "A hesitation about the philosophy of reosen's history"
2002 "What's a question?!"
2006 "Philosophy of Ameri neishabouri"
2008 "The art and wisdom in the Ibne Arabi's philosophy"
2009 "Farabi"
2010 "Metaphysics of Wonder"
2011 "Avicena's metaphysic"

References

Additional references
http://oldenweb.sbu.ac.ir/Default.aspx?tabid=295
http://www.ibna.ir/vdchvvnw.23nmid10t2.html
"نصرالله حکمت: ابن‌عربی در «فتوحات مکیه» از هنر به معنای خا  کلمه بحث کرده است" (Google translation), Iran Book News Agency (IBNA) (About IBNA), Persian date 16 Mordad 1391. Abstract: IBNA reviews a speech given by Nasrollah Hekmat concerning his book "The Art of Wisdom and Mystical Arabia". Archive.
خبرگزاري فارس: كتاب «نقش خيال در فلسفه فارابي» نوشته «نصرالله حكمت» از سوي انتشارات «الهام» منتشر مي‌شود  (Google translation), Fars News Agency (About Fars), Persian date Aban 17 1392. Abstract: Nasrollah is quoted "in an interview with reporters" concerning a book published by another author and provides biographical details about Nasrollah. Archive
"«نصرالله حكمت» در راديو گفت‌وگو از همايش‌های مولانا می‌گويد" (Google translation), Iranian Quran News Agency (IQNA) (About IQNA), Persian date Aban 02 1392. Abstract: News report on a separate radio interview involving Nasrallah.
نصرالله حكمت  (Google translate), magiran.com (Iranian Journal), 3456 Issue. Abstract: Discusses Nasrallah including but not limited to an interview. Archive.
دکتر نصرالله حکمت : کتاب "منهاج الولایه" حاوی فلسفه زندگی است آرشيو شده (Google translate), Aftab ("Iran and World News"), Mehr News Agency. Persian date 24 Mehr 1384. Abstract: Review of book and conference by Nasrallah.
زندگی و انديشه فارابی» در سرای اهل قلم نقد و بررسی می‌شود(Google translate), Great Islamic Encyclopedia Center (About GIEC), Persian date 1387/5/15. Abstract: Reviews the book "The Life and Thought Hakim Abu Nasr Farabi" by Nasrallah. Archive.
Book Awards, Iranian Students News Agency (ISNA), Persian date Bahman 14 1385. Abstract: Nasrallah biographical profile by ISNA as part of an award nomination. Archive.

Islamic philosophers
Philosophers of religion
21st-century Iranian philosophers
1957 births
Living people
Academic staff of Shahid Beheshti University